Juan Pablo López (born 10 April 1972) is a Mexican boxer. He competed in the men's middleweight event at the 1996 Summer Olympics.

References

1972 births
Living people
Mexican male boxers
Olympic boxers of Mexico
Boxers at the 1996 Summer Olympics
Place of birth missing (living people)
Middleweight boxers